Letsok-aw Island (Domel Island) is an island in the Mergui Archipelago, Burma (Myanmar). With a length of 38 km and an area of 250 km2 it is one of the largest islands of the archipelago. This hilly and thickly wooded island lies 14 km east of Bentinck Kyun. It stretches from north to south and has a maximum width of 9.7 km. Highest point 683 m.

References

External links
Myanmar Ecotourism - Ministry of Hotels and Tourism
Mergui Archipelago Photos

Mergui Archipelago